Jules Randrianarivelo (born 28 November 1956) is a Malagasy long-distance runner. He competed in the marathon at the 1980 Summer Olympics and the 1984 Summer Olympics.

References

1956 births
Living people
Athletes (track and field) at the 1980 Summer Olympics
Athletes (track and field) at the 1984 Summer Olympics
Malagasy male long-distance runners
Malagasy male marathon runners
Olympic athletes of Madagascar
Place of birth missing (living people)